The Central Division is one of the three divisions in the Eastern Conference of the National Basketball Association (NBA). The division consists of five teams, the Chicago Bulls, the Cleveland Cavaliers, the Detroit Pistons, the Indiana Pacers and the Milwaukee Bucks. All teams, except the Cavaliers, are former Midwest Division teams, hence the Central Division now largely resembling the Midwest Division in the 1970s.

The division was created at the start of the 1970–71 season, when the league expanded from 14 to 17 teams with the addition of the Buffalo Braves, the Cleveland Cavaliers and the Portland Trail Blazers. The league realigned itself into two conferences, the Western Conference and the Eastern Conference, with two divisions each in each conference. The Central Division began with four inaugural members, the Atlanta Hawks, the Baltimore Bullets, the Cincinnati Royals and the Cleveland Cavaliers. The Hawks joined from the Western Division, while the Bullets and the Royals joined from the Eastern Division.

The Bucks have won the most Central Division titles with eleven. The Pistons have won the second most titles with nine. Thirteen NBA champions came from the Central Division: the Bulls won six championships, the Pistons won three championships, the Bucks won two championships, and the Bullets and Cavaliers won one championship each. All of them, except the 1977–78 Bullets and the 2003–04 Pistons, were division champions. In the 2005–06 season, all five teams from the division qualified for the playoffs. The most recent division champions are the Milwaukee Bucks. The Central Division has the highest percentage of teams that have won a championship, with four out of five teams winning the championship, and the Pacers the only franchise never to have won.

The Central Division existed for one season in the 1949–50 season as one of the three divisions in the NBA, along with the Western and the Eastern Division. The current Central Division that was formed in the 1970, is one of the three divisions in the Eastern Conference.

Since the 2021–22 season, the Central Division champions has received the Wayne Embry Trophy, named after Hall of Famer Wayne Embry.

Current standings

Teams

Notes
 denotes an expansion team.

Former teams

Notes
 denotes an expansion team.
 denotes a team that merged from the American Basketball Association (ABA).
 The Charlotte NBA franchise was inactive from 2002 to 2004 upon the relocation of the Hornets to New Orleans. A new franchise, initially known as the Bobcats, began play in the 2004–05 season. In 2013, the New Orleans Hornets were renamed the Pelicans, and the following season, the Bobcats were renamed the Hornets, acquiring the history and records of the 1988–2002 Hornets while retroactively designating the Pelicans as an expansion team.

Team timeline

Wayne Embry Trophy
Beginning with the 2021–22 season, the Central Division champions has received the Wayne Embry Trophy. As with the other division championship trophies, it is named after one of the African American pioneers from NBA history. Wayne Embry became the NBA's first African American general manager when he was hired by the Milwaukee Bucks in 1972. The Embry Trophy consists of a  crystal ball.

Division champions

Titles by team

Season results

Rivalries

Chicago Bulls vs. Detroit Pistons

Chicago Bulls vs. Cleveland Cavaliers

1949–50 season

Before the 1949–50 season, the BAA merged with the NBL and was renamed NBA. The number of teams competed increased from 12 teams to 17 teams and the league realigned itself to three divisions, creating the Central Division. The division consisted of five teams, the Chicago Stags, the Fort Wayne Pistons, the Minneapolis Lakers, the Rochester Royals and the St. Louis Bombers. All five teams joined from the Western Division. The Minneapolis Lakers won the Central Division title. The division was disbanded before the 1950–51 season, after six teams folded and the league realigned itself back into two divisions. The Stags and the Bombers folded, while the other three teams returned to the Western Division.

Notes
 Because of a lockout, the season did not start until February 5, 1999, and all 29 teams played a shortened 50-game regular season schedule.
 Because of a lockout, the season did not start until December 25, 2011, and all 30 teams played a shortened 66-game regular season schedule.
In the aftermath of the Boston Marathon bombing, the NBA canceled the April 16 game scheduled in Boston between the Celtics and the Pacers; the game was not rescheduled because it would have had no impact on either team's playoff seedings.

References
General

Specific

External links
NBA.com Team Index

Eastern Conference (NBA)
National Basketball Association divisions
NBA
NBA
Atlanta Hawks
Baltimore Bullets (1963–1973)
Capital Bullets
Charlotte Hornets
Chicago Bulls
Cincinnati Royals
Cleveland Cavaliers
Detroit Pistons
Houston Rockets
Indiana Pacers
Milwaukee Bucks
New Orleans Hornets
New Orleans Jazz (NBA team)
Orlando Magic
San Antonio Spurs
Toronto Raptors
Washington Bullets
1970 establishments in the United States